The 1936 Wisconsin Badgers football team was an American football team that represented the University of Wisconsin in the 1936 Big Ten Conference football season. The team compiled a 2–6 record (0–4 against conference opponents) and finished in ninth place in the Big Ten Conference. Harry Stuhldreher was in his first year as Wisconsin's head coach.

Fullback Eddie Jankowski was selected as the team's most valuable player. John Golemgeske was the team captain.

The team played its home games at Camp Randall Stadium, which had a capacity of 32,700. During the 1936 season, the average attendance at home games was 19,117.

Schedule

References

Wisconsin
Wisconsin Badgers football seasons
Wisconsin Badgers football